The Marcomanni were a Germanic people that established a powerful kingdom north of the Danube, somewhere near modern Bohemia, during the peak of power of the nearby Roman Empire. According to Tacitus and Strabo, they were Suebian.

Origin
It is believed their name may derive from Proto-Germanic *markō "border, boundary" (hence the English march or mark, meaning "frontier, border", as in the Welsh marches and the kingdom of Mercia) and *mann- (pl. *manniz) "man", *Markōmanniz, which would have been rendered in Latinised form as Marcomanni.

The Marcomanni first appear in historical records as confederates of the Suebi of Ariovistus fighting against Julius Caesar in Gaul (now France) after they had crossed the Rhine from what is now southern Germany. The exact position of their lands at the time is not known. The fact that their name existed before the Romans had territory near the Danube or Rhine raises the question of which border they lived near to explain their name. Their name may echo an earlier demarcation between the northern Germanic tribes of the Jastorf cultural circle and those of the maximum expansion of the Celts during the earlier and later Iron Age of La Tène dominance throughout Europe. Findings in the archaeological record show that they had pressed north with some influence as far as into Jutland, but they mostly remained separated in the south and settled in oppida over what is now Thuringia and Saxony along the Hercynian Forest, intrinsically connected to the major trade roads that went into the more evolved centres of Bohemia, Moravia and Silesia, which were then all still Celtic regions. It has been suggested that they may have lived near the confluence of the Rhine and Main Rivers in areas that had been inhabited but left deserted by the Helvetii and Taurisci. However, the historian Florus reports that Drusus erected a mound of their spoils during his campaign of 12–9 BC after he had defeated the Tencteri and Chatti, and before next turning to Cherusci, Suevi, and Sicambri. That suggests that they were not close to any obvious border at the time.

According to the accounts of Tacitus (Germ. 42), Paterculus (2.108), Pliny the Elder, and Strabo (vii. p. 290) they eventually moved into the large area that had been occupied by the Boii, specifically in a region already called Baiohaemum, where their allies and fellow Suevi lived, the Quadi. It was described as being within the Hercynian Forest and was possibly in the region of modern Bohemia, but that is not certain. By 6 BC, their king, Maroboduus, had established a powerful kingdom there that Augustus perceived as a threat to the Roman Empire. Before he could act, however, the revolt in Illyria intervened. Eventually, Maroboduus was deposed and exiled by Catualda (AD 19). Catualda was, in turn, deposed by Vibilius of the Hermunduri that year and succeeded by the Quadian Vannius. Around 50 AD, Vannius was himself also deposed by Vibilius, in co-ordination with his nephews Vangio and Sido.

In the late first century, Tacitus mentions (Germania I.42) the Marcomanni as being under kings appointed by Rome.

Marcomannic Wars

In the second century AD, the Marcomanni entered into a confederation with other peoples, including the Quadi, Vandals, and Sarmatians, against the Roman Empire. It was probably driven by movements of larger tribes, like the Goths. According to the historian Eutropius, the forces of the Emperor Marcus Aurelius battled against the Marcomannic confederation for three years at the fortress of Carnuntum, in Pannonia. Eutropius compared the war and Aurelius's success against the Marcomanni and their allies to the Punic Wars. The comparison was apt in that the war marked a turning point, had significant Roman defeats, and caused the death of two Praetorian Guard commanders. The war began in 166, when the Marcomanni overwhelmed the defences between Vindobona and Carnuntum, penetrated along the border between the provinces of Pannonia and Noricum, laid waste to Flavia Solva, and could be stopped only shortly before Aquileia, on the Adriatic Sea. The war lasted until Aurelius's death in 180. It would prove to be only a limited success for Rome since the Danube River remained the frontier of the empire until the fall of the Western Roman Empire.

Later history
The Christianisation of the Marcomanni, at least into a Roman orthodox form of Christianity, seems to have occurred under their queen Fritigil in the mid-4th century. She corresponded with Ambrose of Milan to bring about the conversion. That was the last clear evidence of the Marcomanni having a polity, which was possibly now on the Roman side of the Danube. Soon afterward, the Pannonian and Danubian area went into a long period of turmoil.

After crossing the Rhine in 406 and the Pyrenees in 409, a group of Suevi that had migrated with Vandals and Alans established itself in the Roman province of Gallaecia (modern Galicia and northern Portugal), where it was considered foederati and founded the Suebi kingdom of Gallaecia. The Suevi were probably a mix of Suevian groups from the area north of Danube and Pannonian basin such as the Marcomanni, Quadi and Buri.

There, Hermeric swore fealty to the emperor in 410. Bracara Augusta, the modern city of Braga in Portugal, had been the capital of Roman Gallaecia and now became the capital of the Suebic Kingdom.

The Danubian area, meanwhile, became the core of Attila the Hunnic Empire, and within it seem to have been many Suebians. One group of them managed to reform into an independent group after the Battle of Nedao in 454, like many other groups that emerged from Attila's confederation. Those Suevi eventually came into conflict with the Ostrogoths, who had lost at Nadao.

Jordanes, the historian of the Goths, reported (Getica 280) that after the Battle of Bolia, the Ostrogoths attacked the Suevi (ruled by a man named Hunimund, who also seemingly led an attack on Passau) by crossing the Danube when it was frozen and going into a high Alpine area held by the confederates of the Suevi at the time, the Alamanni. (He said that several streams start in the area and enter the Danube.) The region held by those Suevi was described as having Bavarians to the east, Franks to the west, Burgundians to the south, and Thuringians to the north. The text seems to indicate that the Suevi had moved into the Alamannic area but that Suevi were seen as distinct from both Alamanni and Bavarians. That was also the first mention of Bavarians, who are also often proposed to have had Marcomanni in their ancestry.

According to historians such as Herwig Wolfram:

The Marcomanni and the Quadi gave up their special names after crossing the Danube, in fact both the emigrants and the groups remaining in Pannonia became Suebi again. The Pannonian Suebi became subjects of the Huns. After the battle at the Nadao they set up their kingdom, and when it fell, they came, successively under Herulian and Longobard rule, south of the Danube under Gothic rule, and eventually again under Longobard rule.

There is a runic alphabet called the Marcomannic runes, but they are not believed to be related to the Marcomanni.

Kings
 Maroboduus, c. 9 BC – 18 AD
 Catualda, 18 – 20
 Vannius, 20 – c. 50
 Vangio and Sido, c. 50 – ?
 Ballomar, c. 166? – 172 or 178?
 Attalus, c. 260/2
 Fritigil, mid-4th century, queen

See also
 History of Portugal
 History of Spain
 Irminones
 List of ancient Germanic peoples 
 Migrations period
 Timeline of Germanic kingdoms

References

Classical sources
 Caesar De Bello Gallico, at The Latin Library
 Tacitus Germania, at The Latin Library
 Tacitus Annales, at The Latin Library

External links
 

 
Early Germanic peoples
Suebi